Mario Petrucci (born 1958) is a British poet, literary translator, educator and broadcaster. He was born in Lambeth, London and trained as a physicist at Selwyn College in the University of Cambridge and later completed a PhD in vacuum crystal growth at University College London.  He is also an ecologist, having a BA in Environmental Science from Middlesex University. Petrucci was the first poet to be resident at the Imperial War Museum and with BBC Radio 3.  In 2022, he was invited by the Society of Authors to judge the John Florio Prize for Italian translation.  His first major collection, Shrapnel and Sheets (1996), won a Poetry Book Society Recommendation.  He has been much involved in radio broadcasting and in the educational sector, in creative writing and literary mentoring.  He has generated many educational resources that incorporate creative writing, science and ecology. Petrucci's poetry has also been deployed in a number of films. For instance, Heavy Water: a film for Chernobyl and Half Life: a Journey to Chernobyl were based on his award-winning poetry collection on Chernobyl. Produced by Seventh Art Productions, these films have garnered awards such as the Cinequest as well as screenings on mainstream television and at major cultural venues such as Tate Modern (in 2007).  2012 saw Petrucci shortlisted for the Ted Hughes Award
 with a vast poetry soundscape (among the largest ever created) entitled Tales from the Bridge.
 
This installation spanned the Thames (on the Millennium Bridge, London) as part of the London 2012 Cultural Olympiad.  Collaborators for the project included Martyn Ware (The Human League) and Eric Whitacre, whose music was used.

Books and pamphlets 
 Shrapnel and Sheets (Headland, 1996)   (Poetry Book Society Recommendation).
 Bosco (Hearing Eye: leaflet 1999; book 2001)   & .
 Lepidoptera (Kite Modern Poetry Series, 88 & 96; 1999, 2001)   & .
 The Stamina of Sheep (the Havering Poems) (Havering London Borough Council / Bound Spiral Press, 2002)  .
 The Havering Poetry Study Pack (Havering London Borough Council / Bound Spiral Press, 2002)  .
 High Zest and the Doggerel March (Wilfred Owen – Genius or Sugar-stick?) (Bound Spiral Press, 2002)  
 Heavy Water: a poem for Chernobyl (Enitharmon Press, 2004)  .
 Half Life (Poems for Chernobyl) (Heaventree Press, 2004)  .
 Catullus (Perdika Press, 2006)  (second re-print 2007).
 Flowers of Sulphur (Enitharmon Press, 2007)  .
 somewhere is january (Perdika Press, 2007)  .
 Sappho (Perdika Press, 2008) .
 i tulips (Enitharmon Press, 2010) .
 Nights * Sifnos * Hands (Flarestack Poets, 2010) .
 the waltz in my blood (Waterloo Press, 2011) .
 the inward garden (St Edmund’s College, 2013) [limited edition] .
 anima (Nine Arches Press, 2013) .
 crib (Enitharmon Press, 2014) .
 1111 (Perdika Press, 2014) .
 Xenia (Arc Publications, 2016)   (Translation of Xenia by Eugenio Montale).
 Beloved: 81 poems from Hafez (Bloodaxe Books, 2018)   (translation of The Divan by Persian mystic poet Hafez).
 Isha Upanishad (Guillemot Press, 2019) (a modern English vers libre version of the ancient sacred Hindu text, the Isha Upanishad).
 afterlove (Cinnamon Press, 2020)  .
 Dawn Ravens (23 poems from Saadi and Rumi) (Lapwing Publications, 2022)  .
 Moonbird : love poems (Fair Acre Press, 2023) .

Films 
 Heavy Water: a film for Chernobyl (with Phil Grabsky & David Bickerstaff) Seventh Art Productions, 2006.
 Half Life: a journey to Chernobyl (with Phil Grabsky & David Bickerstaff) Seventh Art Productions, 2006.
 Amazonia (with Lucy + Jorge Orta), commissioned by the Natural History Museum, 2010.

Awards 
 1993 Winner, London Writers Competition
 1995 Edith Kitt Memorial Award
 1996 Poetry Book Society Recommendation
 1996 Edith Kitt Memorial Award
 1997 Winner, Sheffield Thursday Prize
 1997 Winner, inaugural Irish Times Perpetual Trophy
 1998 New London Writers Award (London Arts)
 1998 Winner, London Writers Competition
 1998 Winner, Sheffield Thursday Prize
 1999 Bridport Poetry Prize
 2002 Daily Telegraph / Arvon International Poetry Prize
 2002 Arts Council England Writers' Award
 2003 Essex Book Awards Best Fiction Prize 2000–2002
 2003 Silver Wyvern Award
 2004 Winner, London Writers Competition
 2004 National Poetry Competition: third prize cum laude
 2005/2006 Arts Council England Grants for the Arts: Science in Poetry
 2005 Winner, London Writers Competition
 2007 Cinequest Film Festival Award, Best Short Documentary (Half Life: a Journey to Chernobyl)
 2009/10 Arts Council England Grants for the Arts: i tulips
 2012 Shortlisted for The Ted Hughes Award for New Work in Poetry: Tales from the Bridge
 2016 Winner, PEN Translates Award
 2018 Shortlisted: John Florio Prize for Italian Translation (with Xenia by Eugenio Montale)

References

External links 
 
 Royal Literary Fund
 Poetry International Web or archived page
 Author's homepage
 Author's YouTube channel - poems, creative writing resources
 'Writing Into Freedom' - free online creative writing videos/audios

Writers from London
Alumni of University College London
21st-century British poets
1958 births
Living people
20th-century British poets
Alumni of Selwyn College, Cambridge
Alumni of Middlesex University
21st-century Italian poets
20th-century Italian poets